Sweden competed at the 2014 European Athletics Championships in Zürich, Switzerland, from 12–17 August 2013. A delegation of 60 athletes were sent to represent the country.

The following athletes has been selected to compete by the Swedish Athletics Federation. Marathon-runner Isabellah Andersson was nominated but withdrew from participation due to injury. Hurdler-runner Philip Nossmy has also withdrawn.

Medals

Men

Track and road

Field events

Combined events – Decathlon

Women

Track and road

Field events

Combined events – Heptathlon

Key
Q = Qualified for the next round; q = Qualified for the next round as a fastest loser or, in field events, by position without achieving the qualifying target; N/A = Round not applicable for the event

References

Nations at the 2014 European Athletics Championships
Sweden at the European Athletics Championships
European Athletics Championships